The 2020–21 Bahraini Premier League (also known as Nasser Bin Hamad Premier League for sponsorship reasons), was the 64th top-level football season in Bahrain. The season started on 8 December 2020, and ended on 26 May 2021.

Team location

League table

Results

Relegation play-off

1st Leg

2nd Leg

Al-Najma wins 3–0 on aggregate. Both teams stay in their current leagues respectively.

Season statistics

Top scorers

References

Bahraini Premier League seasons
Bahrain
Bahraini Premier League, 2020-21